Maa Simsa Mandir or Simsa Mata Mandir is a Hindu temples located in the Mandi district and kangra district of Himachal Pradesh, India. The temple is dedicated to the Sharada Devi. One temple is located in the Simsa village, 30 km from the Baijnath town and other one Simsa mata temple in  Daroh village, 17 km (10.56 miles) from the Palampur. The temples are very popular among the people of the Kangra and Mandi district during the Navratri.

Navratri Special
During Navratri, many women with no children come here to seek the blessings of goddess Sharada Devi. it is believed that goddess gives those ladies babies in gift. According to the tradition, all these women sleep on the floor in the temple premises. It is believed that these ladies have a dream which tells them that their prayers have been accepted.

References

Buildings and structures in Mandi district
Hindu temples in Himachal Pradesh